Professor Sir James Runcieman Sutherland (1900–1996) was an English literary scholar, Lord Northcliffe Professor of Modern Literature at London University.

Life
Sutherland was born on 26 April 1900 in Aberdeen. He was educated at Aberdeen Grammar School and Aberdeen University before studying at Merton College, Oxford. From 1930 to 1936 he was Senior Lecturer at University College London. He married Helen Dircks in 1931. From 1936 to 1944 he was Professor of English Literature, and from 1944 to 1951 Professor of English Language and Literature at Queen Mary College. In 1951 he was appointed Lord Northcliffe Professor of Modern English Literature at University College London, and he held the chair until retirement in 1967. From 1957 to 1962 he was Public Orator at London University.

After his first wife died in 1975, he married Mrs Eve Betts in 1977. He was knighted in 1992. He died in Oxford on 24 February 1996.

Works
 The medium of poetry, 1934
 Defoe, 1937
 A preface to eighteenth century poetry, 1938
 The tempest, 1939
 Background for Queen Anne, 1939
 Fifteen poets: Chaucer, Spenser, Shakespeare, Milton, Dryden, Pope, Cowper, Coleridge, Wordsworth, Shelley, Byron, Keats, Browning, Tennyson, Arnold, 1941
 The Dunciad, 1942
 Wordsworth and Pope, 1944
 The Oxford book of English talk, 1952
 Restoration & Augustan prose; papers delivered by James R. Sutherland and Ian Watt at the third Clark Library seminar, 14 July 1956, 1956
 Early eighteenth century poetry, 1956
 On English prose, 1957
 English satire, 1958
 (ed. with Joel Hurstfield) Shakespeare's world, 1964
 Robinson Crusoe, and other writings, 1968
 English literature of the late seventeenth century, 1969
 Daniel Defoe: a critical study, 1971
 The Oxford book of literary anecdotes, 1975
 Restoration tragedies, 1977
 The Restoration newspaper and its development, 1986

References

External links 
 

1900 births
1996 deaths
English literature academics
Academics of University College London
Alumni of Merton College, Oxford